Sunwapta Falls is a pair of waterfalls of the Sunwapta River located in Jasper National Park, Alberta, Canada.

The falls are accessible via a  access road off the Icefields Parkway, which connects Jasper and Banff National Parks. Sunwapta is a Stoney language word that means "turbulent water". The falls is most spectacular in the late spring when the spring melt is at its peak.

There are two falls, a lower and an upper one. The one most people see is the upper falls, as access is easier. The lower falls are a short distance away. The water originates from the Athabasca Glacier, and volumes are higher in early summer because of glacial melting.

See also
 Canadian Rockies
 North America
 Wildlife of Canada

References

External links
 

Waterfalls of Alberta
Jasper National Park